Phil Berg may refer to:

 Philip J. Berg (born 1944), American attorney
 Phil Berg (talent agent) (1902–1983), American talent agent